Bonn is an electoral constituency (German: Wahlkreis) represented in the Bundestag. It elects one member via first-past-the-post voting. Under the current constituency numbering system, it is designated as constituency 96. It is located in southwestern North Rhine-Westphalia, comprising the city of Bonn.

Bonn was created for the inaugural 1949 federal election. Since 2021, it has been represented by Katrin Uhlig of the Alliance 90/The Greens.

Geography
Bonn is located in southwestern North Rhine-Westphalia. As of the 2021 federal election, it is coterminous with the independent city of Bonn.

History
Bonn was created in 1949, then known as Bonn-Stadt und -Land. It acquired its current name in the 1965 election. In the 1949 election, it was North Rhine-Westphalia constituency 10 in the numbering system. From 1953 through 1961, it was number 69. From 1965 through 1998, it was number 63. From 2002 through 2009, it was number 97. Since the 2013 election, it has been number 96.

Originally, the constituency comprised the city of Bonn and the district of Landkreis Bonn. It acquired its current borders in the 1965 election.

Members
The constituency was first represented by Konrad Adenauer, the first Chancellor of the Federal Republic of Germany, from 1949 until his death in 1967. He was a member of the Christian Democratic Union (CDU). In the 1969 election, he was succeeded by fellow CDU member Alo Hauser, who served until 1983. Hans Daniels of the CDU was then elected and served two terms. Party fellow Editha Limbach became representative in 1990, followed by Norbert Hauser in 1998. The constituency was won by the Social Democratic Party (SPD) for the first time in 2002, and represented by Ulrich Kelber. He was re-elected in 2005, 2009, 2013, and 2017. Kelber resigned in January 2020 after being elected Federal Commissioner for Data Protection. Katrin Uhlig won the constituency for the Greens in 2021.

Election results

2021 election

2017 election

2013 election

2009 election

References

Federal electoral districts in North Rhine-Westphalia
Constituencies established in 1949
1949 establishments in West Germany